Leslie Allen "Les" Warren is an American politician serving as a member of the Arkansas House of Representatives from the 25th district. Elected in November 2016, he assumed office in January 2017.

Early life and education 
Warren was born in Smackover, Arkansas. He earned a master's degree from the University of Arkansas.

Career 
Outside of politics, Warren is the president of the Hot Springs Title Company. He also served on the board of the Lakeside School District and was a member of the Greater Hot Springs Chamber of Commerce. He was elected to the Arkansas House of Representatives in November 2016 and assumed office in January 2017. Since 2019, Warren has also served as chair of the House Public Retirement and Social Security Programs Committee.

References 

Living people
Republican Party members of the Arkansas House of Representatives
University of Arkansas alumni
People from Smackover, Arkansas
People from Hot Springs, Arkansas
Year of birth missing (living people)
21st-century American politicians